Jean Hager (born June 2, 1932) is an American writer of mystery fiction, children's fiction, and romance novels. She has published romance novels under the pseudonyms Jeanne Stephens, Leah Crane, Marlaine Kyle, Amanda McAllister, and Sara North, as well as in her own name.  Two of her three mystery series involve modern Cherokee life in Oklahoma and feature either police chief Mitch Bushyhead or civil rights investigator Molly Bearpaw. The third series is set in Iris House, a bed and breakfast establishment in Missouri that features amateur sleuth Tess Darcy.

Hager attended Oklahoma State University from 1950 to 1953, the University of Tulsa from 1964 to 1966, completed a B.A. at Central State University in Edmond, Oklahoma, in 1969, and did graduate study at the University of Oklahoma in 1969–70. After teaching high school English from 1970 through 1974, she turned to full-time writing in 1975. 

She won the Oklahoma Writers Federation Teepee Award five times, was named Oklahoma Writer of the Year in 1982, and was inducted into the Oklahoma Professional Writers Hall of Fame in 1992. Her professional memberships have included Mystery Writers of America, Sisters in Crime, and American Crime Writers.

Critical reception
Jean Swanson in St. James Guide to Crime and Mystery Writers said in 1996 that the Mitch Bushyhead books are essentially Cherokee-related police procedurals and that the Molly Bearpaw series focuses more on Cherokee culture than the Bushyhead series. The Iris House books belong to a subcategory of mysteries known as "cozies".

Of the Bushyhead mystery The Grandfather Medicine, a reviewer for Publishers Weekly said, "The prose here is serviceable and the puzzle smoothly concocted and solved." The Publishers Weekly review for The Redbird's Cry, a Molly Bearpaw mystery, said, "Although the politics are sometimes cursorily handled, Hager explores the Cherokee culture with trenchant compassion rather than overcareful reverence and deftly inserts hairpin turns into the narrative."

Publishers Weekly treated her Molly Bearpaw series more positively than did Kirkus Reviews, calling it an entertaining series and saying that the writer "captures the rhythms of life in Tahlequah and creates in Bearpaw a charming and intelligent--albeit reluctant--detective." Kirkus praised her plotting but noted a lack of "motivation" for the murders themselves. About her 1994 book The Redbird's Cry, Kirkus said it was not a match for her Bushyhead adventures, as it was slow-moving and "padded" with chatter and romances. Kirkus wrote for the 1995 book Seven Black Stones that "While the chilly disharmonies of failing marriages get sensitive treatment here," the murder plot seems "undermotivated." Her 1996 book The Fire Carrier was called "labored" and "not one of Hager's better efforts" by Kirkus. Kirkus called her 1997 book The Spirit Caller "tidily plotted and mildly entertaining, with special appeal to aficionados of Native American lore", and her 1998 book Masked Dancers "tidily plotted but uncompellingly motivated."

Bibliography

Mystery novels
For children
 The Secret of Riverside Farm (1970) 
 The Whispering House (1970) 

For adults
 Terror in the Sunlight (1976) 
 Yellow-Flower Moon (1981) 
 Captured by Love (1982) 
 The Grandfather Medicine (1989) 
 Night Walker (1990) 
 Ravenmocker (1992) 
 Ghostland (1992) 
 The Redbird's Cry (1994) 
 Blooming Murder (1994) 
 Seven Black Stones (1995) 
 Dead and Buried (1995) 
 Death on the Drunkard's Path (1996) 
 The Fire Carrier (1996) 
 The Last Noel (1997) 
 The Spirit Caller (1997)  	
 Masked Dancers (1998) 
 Weigh Dead (1999) 
 Sew Deadly (2000) 
 Bride and Doom (2001)

Romance novels
As Jean Hager
 Terror in the Sunlight (1977) 
 Web of Desire (1981) 
 Portrait of Love (1981) 
 Secret Intentions (1985) 
 The Passionate Solution (1986) 

As Amanda McAllister
 No Need for Fear (1976) 
 Trust No One at All (1976) 
 Waiting for Caroline (1976) 
 Pretty Enough to Kill (1976) 

As Sara North
 Jasmine for My Grave (1978) 
 Evil Side of Eden (1978) 
 Shadow of the Tamaracks (1979) 

As Jeanne Stephens
 Mexican Nights (1980) 
 Wonder and Wild Desire (1981) 
 Bride in Barbados (1982) 
 Sweet Jasmine (1982) 
 The Splendored Sky (1983) 
 No Other Love (1983) 
 Reckless Surrender (1983) 
 Memories (1984) 
 Mandy's Song (1985) 
 Coming Home (1985) 
 This Long Winter Past (1986) 
 Whispers on the Wind (1986) 
 A Few Shining Hours (1986) 
 Long Winter Past (1986) 
 Return to Eden (1987) 
 Neptune Summer (1987) 
 Dangerous Choices (1988) 
 Sharing California (1989) 
 Wild Horizons (1989) 
 At Risk (1989) 
 Hiding Places (1990) 
 Summer Heat (1991) 

As Marlaine Kyle
 A Suitable Marriage (1982) 

As Leah Crane
 Dark Ecstasy (1983)

Other
As Jean Hager
 How to Write & Market Your Mystery Novel: A Step-by-Step Guide from Idea to Final Rewrite and Marketing (1998)

References

1932 births
20th-century American women writers
American crime fiction writers
Writers from Oklahoma
Living people
Oklahoma State University alumni
University of Tulsa alumni
University of Central Oklahoma alumni
Writers from Illinois
21st-century American women writers